Tha Lo is a tambon (sub-district) of Mueang Phichit District, Phichit Province, upper central Thailand.

History
The name "Tha Lo", directly translated as "pier of mules", it is described as having a pier for loading and unloading mules on the bank. However, according to local people, it is believed that the name is distorted from the word Tha Lo (ท่าล้อ), literally means "pier of wheels". Because this area in the past was a centre of wheeled vehicles for hauling wood and wagon that used to transport agricultural products.

Tha Lo is considered one of the oldest communities in Phichit. And because Tha Lo is the confluence of Wang Thong (locally known as Khlong Tha Lo) and Nan Rivers, thus making it an important water trade route since Ayutthaya period. Wat Tha Lo temple is a spiritual anchor of community. San Chao Mae Thap Thim Tha Lo, a Chinese temple lies on the east bank of Nan River. An ancient shrine dedicated to Shui Wei Sheng Niang, the goddess of the sea and navigation according to the ancient beliefs of the Chinese. Her idol is believed to be the oldest wood-carved figure of Shu Wei Sheng Niang in Thailand.

Nowadays, locals retain their lifestyles as in the past.

Geography
Its terrain is a floodplain, suitable for agriculture, with a total area of 21.9 km2 (13,688 rai). 

Sub-districts adjacent to Tha Lo are (from north clockwise): Phi Lom in Bang Krathum District of Phitsanulok Province, Pa Makhap in its district, Pak Thang in its district, and Phai Khwang in its district, respectively.

Administration
Tha Lo is administered by the Subdistrict Administrative Organization (SAO) Tha Lo (องค์การบริหารส่วนตำบลท่าฬ่อ).

Tha Lo also consists of 7 administrative villages (muban). The village no. 1, 3, 4 are outside the municipality and 8 km (4 mi) from Phichit town.

Economy
Most of the locals work in agriculture and fisheries.

Transportation
Tha Lo is served by the Tha Lo railway station of the State Railway of Thailand (SRT), whose Northern Line runs through the area. The station is about 354 km (219 mi) from Bangkok railway station (Hua Lamphong). The railway bridge across the Nan River of Tha Lo was built in 1966 by Mitsui & Co., Ltd. of Japan.

Places
Wat Tha Lo
Chao Mae Thap Thim Tha Lo Shrine
Tha Lo Market
Yok Eng Chinese School

Local products
Thai desserts
Artificial bonsai

References

External links
Tha Lo.go.th

Tambon of Phichit Province